The euphonium is a medium-sized, 3 or 4-valve, often compensating, conical-bore, tenor-voiced brass instrument that derives its name from the Ancient Greek word  euphōnos, meaning "well-sounding" or "sweet-voiced" ( eu means "well" or "good" and  phōnē means "sound", hence "of good sound"). The euphonium is a valved instrument. Nearly all current models have piston valves, though some models with rotary valves do exist.

Euphonium music may be notated in the bass clef as a non-transposing instrument or in the treble clef as a transposing instrument in B. In British brass bands, it is typically treated as a treble-clef instrument, while in American band music, parts may be written in either treble clef or bass clef, or both.

Name 
The euphonium is in the family of brass instruments, more particularly low-brass instruments with many relatives. It is extremely similar to a baritone horn. The difference is that the bore size of the baritone horn is typically smaller than that of the euphonium, and the baritone has a primarily cylindrical bore, whereas the euphonium has a predominantly conical bore. It is controversial whether this is sufficient to make them two different instruments. In the trombone family large and small bore trombones are both called trombones, while the cylindrical trumpet and the conical flugelhorn are given different names. As with the trumpet and flugelhorn, the two instruments are easily doubled by one player, with some modification of breath and embouchure, since the two have identical range and essentially identical fingering. The cylindrical baritone offers a brighter sound and the conical euphonium offers a more mellow sound.

The American baritone, featuring three valves on the front of the instrument and a curved, forward-pointing bell, was dominant in American school bands throughout most of the 20th century, its weight, shape, and configuration conforming to the needs of the marching band. While this instrument is a conical-cylindrical bore hybrid, somewhere between the classic baritone horn and euphonium, it was almost universally labelled a "baritone" by both band directors and composers, thus contributing to the confusion of terminology in the United States.

Several late 19th century music catalogs (such as Pepper and Lyon & Healy) sold a euphonium-like instrument called the "B bass" (to distinguish it from the E and BB bass). In these catalog drawings, the B Bass had thicker tubing than the baritone; both had three valves. Along the same lines, drum and bugle corps introduced the "Bass-baritone", and distinguished it from the baritone. The thicker tubing of the three-valve B bass allowed for production of strong false-tones, providing chromatic access to the pedal register.

Ferdinand Sommer's original name for the instrument was the euphonion. It is sometimes called the tenor tuba in B, although this can also refer to other varieties of tuba. Names in other languages, as included in scores, can be ambiguous as well. They include French basse, saxhorn basse, and tuba basse; German Baryton, Tenorbass, and Tenorbasshorn; Italian baritono, bombardino, eufonio, and flicorno basso. The most common German name, Baryton, may have influenced Americans to adopt the name "baritone" for the instrument, due to the influx of German musicians to the United States in the nineteenth century.

History and development 

As a baritone-voiced brass instrument, the euphonium traces its ancestry to the ophicleide and ultimately back to the serpent. The search for a satisfactory foundational wind instrument that could support massed sound above its pitch took many years. While the serpent was used for over two centuries dating back to the late Renaissance, it was notoriously difficult to control its pitch and tone quality due to its disproportionately small open finger holes. The ophicleide, which was used in bands and orchestras for a few decades in the early to mid-19th century, used a system of keys and was an improvement over the serpent but was still unreliable, especially in the high register.

With the invention of the piston valve system  1818, the construction of brass instruments with an even sound and facility of playing in all registers became possible. The euphonium is said to have been invented, as a "wide-bore, valved bugle of baritone range", by Ferdinand Sommer of Weimar in 1843, though Carl Moritz in 1838 and Adolphe Sax in 1843 have also been credited. While Sax's family of saxhorns were invented at about the same time and the bass saxhorn is very similar to a euphonium, there are also differences—such as the bass saxhorn being narrower throughout the length of the instrument.

The "British-style" compensating euphonium was developed in 1874 by David Blaikley, of Boosey & Co, and has been in use in Britain since then, with the basic construction little changed.

Modern-day euphonium makers have been working to further enhance the construction of the instrument. Companies such as Adams and Besson have been leading the way in that respect. Adams euphoniums have developed an adjustable lead-pipe receiver, which allows players to change the timbre of the instrument to whatever they find preferable. Besson has been credited with the introducing an adjustable main tuning-slide trigger, which allows players more flexibility with intonation.

Construction and general characteristics 
The euphonium, like the tenor trombone, is pitched in concert B. For a valved brass instrument like the euphonium, this means that when no valves are in use the instrument will produce partials of the B harmonic series. It is generally orchestrated as a non-transposing instrument like the trombone, written at concert pitch in the bass clef with higher passages in the tenor clef. Treble clef euphonium parts transposing down a major ninth are included in much concert band music: in the British-style brass band tradition, euphonium music is always written this way. In continental European band music, parts for the euphonium may be written in the bass clef as a B transposing instrument sounding a major second lower than written.

Professional models have three top-action valves, played with the first three fingers of the right hand, plus a "compensating" fourth valve, generally found midway down the right side of the instrument, played with the left index finger; such an instrument is shown at the top of this page. Beginner models often have only the three top-action valves, while some intermediate "student" models may have a fourth top-action valve, played with the fourth finger of the right hand. Compensating systems are expensive to build, and there is in general a substantial difference in price between compensating and non-compensating models. For a thorough discussion of the valves and the compensation system, see the article on brass instruments.

The euphonium has an extensive range, comfortably from E2 to about E4 for intermediate players  (using scientific pitch notation). In professional hands this may extend from B0 to as high as B5. The lowest notes obtainable depend on the valve set-up of the instrument. All instruments are chromatic down to E2, but four-valved instruments extend that down to at least C2. Non-compensating four-valved instruments suffer from intonation problems from E2 down to C2 and cannot produce the low B1; compensating instruments do not have such intonation problems and can play the low B1. From B1 down lies the "pedal range", i.e., the fundamentals of the instrument's harmonic series. They are easily produced on the euphonium as compared to other brass instruments, and the extent of the range depends on the make of the instrument in exactly the same way as just described. Thus, on a compensating four-valved instrument, the lowest note possible is B0, sometimes called double pedal B, which is six ledger lines below the bass clef.

As with the other conical-bore instruments, the cornet, flugelhorn, horn, and tuba, the euphonium's tubing (excepting the tubing in the valve section, which is necessarily cylindrical) gradually increases in diameter throughout its length, resulting in a softer, gentler tone compared to cylindrical-bore instruments such as the trumpet, trombone, sudrophone, and baritone horn. While a truly characteristic euphonium sound is rather hard to define precisely, most players would agree that an ideal sound is dark, rich, warm, and velvety, with virtually no hardness to it. This also has to do with the different models preferred by British and American players.

Though the euphonium's fingerings are no different from those of the trumpet or tuba, beginning euphoniumists will likely experience significant problems with intonation, response and range compared to other beginning brass players.

Types

Compensating

The compensating euphonium is common among professionals. It utilizes a three-plus-one-valve system with three upright valves and one side valve. The compensating valve system uses extra tubing, usually coming off of the back of the three upright valves, in order to achieve proper intonation in the lower range of the instrument. This range being from E2 down to B1. Not all four-valve and three-plus-one-valve euphoniums are compensating. Only those designed with extra tubing are compensating. There were, at one time, three-valve compensating euphoniums available. This configuration utilized extra tubing, just as the three-plus-one compensating models did, in order to bring the notes C2 and B1 in tune. This three-valve compensating configuration is still available in British style baritone horns, usually on professional models.

Double-bell 

A creation unique to the United States was the double-bell euphonium, featuring a second smaller bell in addition to the main one; the player could switch bells for certain passages or even for individual notes by use of an additional valve, operated with the left hand. Ostensibly, the smaller bell was intended to emulate the sound of a trombone (it was cylindrical-bore) and was possibly intended for performance situations in which trombones were not available. The extent to which the difference in sound and timbre was apparent to the listener, however, is up for debate. Michele Raffayolo of the Patrick S. Gilmore band introduced the instrument in the U.S. by 1880, and it was used widely in both school and service bands for several decades. Harold Brasch (see "List of important players" below) brought the British-style compensating euphonium to the United States c. 1939, but the double-belled euphonium may have remained in common use even into the 1950s and 1960s. In any case, they have become rare (they were last in Conn's advertisements in the 1940s, and King's catalog in the 1960s), and are generally unknown to younger players. They are chiefly known now through their mention in the song "Seventy-Six Trombones" from the musical The Music Man by Meredith Willson.

Marching 

Marching euphoniums are used by marching bands and in drum and bugle corps. Typically in a drum corps, there will be two baritone parts and one euphonium part, with the euphonium playing the lower parts comparatively. Some corps (such as the Blue Devils) march all-euphonium sections rather than only marching baritone or a mix of both. In high school marching bands, the two will often be used interchangeably.

Depending on the manufacturer, the weight of these instruments can be straining to the average marcher and require great strength to hold during practices and performances, leading to nerve problems in the right pinky, a callus on the left hand, and possibly back and arm problems. Marching euphoniums and marching baritones commonly have 3 valves, opposed to the regular euphonium having 4.

Another form of the marching euphonium is the convertible euphonium. Recently widely produced, the horn resembles a convertible tuba, being able to change from a concert upright to a marching forward bell on either the left or right shoulder. These are mainly produced by Jupiter or Yamaha, but other less expensive versions can be found.

Five valves 
The five-valve euphonium (non-compensating) is an extremely rare variation of the euphonium manufactured in the late 19th and early 20th centuries by Britain's Besson musical instrument company and Highams of Manchester Musical Instrument Company. 
Higham and Besson's Clearbore five-valve euphonium was economical but not widely used.

The Besson five-valve euphonium featured the standard three piston valves horizontally not on top, but had an additional two piston valves off to the side. The standard euphonium has eight possible fingering and non-fingering positions by which sound is produced. The Besson and the Highams "clearbore" model rare fourth and fifth extra "side" valves change the possible fingering and non-fingering positions from eight to thirty-two.

The term 'five-valve euphonium' does not refer to variations of the double bell euphonium made by various brass instrument companies during the same time period. Some of the double-bell euphoniums had five valves, with the fifth valve either not on top with the other four, or by itself off to the side, but the double-bell fifth valve was used for switching the sound to the second smaller trombone-sized bell, and not for changing the fingering pitch of the instrument. Also, Cerveny Musical Instruments manufactures several euphoniums with five vertical rotary valves today, but this is an unrelated recent development.

Notable euphonium players 

German Ferdinand Sommer, if one discounts the claims of Moritz and Sax each of whose horns also approached a euphonium in nature, in addition to being credited with inventing the euphonium as the Sommerhorn in 1843, as a soloist on the horn, qualifies as the first euphonium player to significantly advance and alter the understanding of the instrument.

United Kingdom 
 Alfred James Phasey (1834–1888), English ophicleide, baritone and euphonium artist credited with modifying the bore of the baritone saxhorn, precursor of the baritone horn, to enlarge it and make it more resonant thereby creating the first true euphonium which he went on to popularize as a performer and author of an early instructional method for tenor brass.
 Steven Mead, English euphonium soloist and professor at the Royal Northern College of Music noted internationally for advancing the British euphonium sound.
 David Thornton, principal euphonium of the Brighouse and Rastrick Band and student of Steven Mead noted for winning several prestigious international competitions and advancing the British euphonium sound through broadcast as well as recording media.

United States 
 Simone Mantia (1873–1951), an Italian-born American baritone horn/euphonium virtuoso and also trombone artist at the start of the 20th century. Playing as soloist with the Sousa and the Pryor Bands, Mantia was the first euphonium virtuoso to record and popularized this non-orchestral instrument in the United States.
 Leonard Falcone (1899–1985), Italian-born American baritone/euphonium soloist, arranger, professor, Director of Bands at Michigan State University, and teacher of many noted euphonium artists. Falcone advanced an operatic passionate baritone style and is the namesake of the Leonard Falcone International Tuba and Euphonium Festival, the leading venue for the instrument in the United States.
 Arthur W. Lehman, (1917–2009), American euphonium soloist known as 'Art', Recording Artist, United States Marine Band, noted euphonium author of works such as The Art of Euphonium. Lehman was a student of Harold Brasch and Simone Mantia and advanced the concept of a rich resonant sound with no vibrato pioneered by Mantia.
 Brian Bowman, former soloist with the U.S. Navy Band (1971–75) and U.S. Air Force Band (1976–91); former professor of euphonium at the University of North Texas, co-editor of "Arban's Method for Trombone and Euphonium". Bowman innovated a fusion of the mellow British sound with deep passion heard in Falcone recordings, becoming the best known American artist at the end of the 20th century through recording, teaching and the first euphonium recital at Carnegie Hall.
 Bernard Atwell McKinney, later Kiane Zawadi (born 1932) jazz trombonist and euphonium player, one of the few jazz soloists on the latter instrument.

Japan 
 Toru Miura, professor of euphonium at the Kunitachi College of Music; soloist and clinician who was awarded a lifetime achievement award by the International Tuba Euphonium Association (formerly TUBA) for his role in promoting the instrument.

Brazil 
 Irineu de Almeida (known as Irineu Batina) (1863-1916), one of the most influential musicians and professors of the genre of Choro, the very first Brazilian typical music. Irineu was an active composer, euphoniumist, ophicleidist and professor, and has participated in the very first commercial recordings of brazilian music, from 1900 onwards, in Rio de Janeiro, playing both euphonium and ophicleide, as a composer, soloist and counterpointist. De Almeida was also professor of the prodigy Pixinguinha, who later became the most important developer of the whole genre of Choro, and one of the most important creators in Brazilian music history. Due to Irineu Batina and his contemporaries, the bombardino is an essential part of the genre of Choro, which is an intangible cultural heritage in Brazil.

Repertoire 

The euphonium repertoire consists of solo literature and orchestral, or, more commonly, concert band parts written for the euphonium. Since its invention in 1843, the euphonium has always had an important role in ensembles, but solo literature was slow to appear, consisting of only a handful of lighter solos until the 1960s. Since then, however, the breadth and depth of the solo euphonium repertoire has increased dramatically.

In the current age, there has been a huge number of new commissions and repertoire development and promotion through Steven Mead's World of the Euphonium Series and the Beyond the Horizon series from Euphonium.com. There has also been a vast number of new commissions by more and more players and a proliferation of large scale Consortium Commissions that are occurring including current ones in 2008 and 2009 organized by Brian Meixner (Libby Larson), Adam Frey (The Euphonium Foundation Consortium), and Jason Ham (David Gillingham).

Upon its invention, it was clear that the euphonium had, compared to its predecessors the serpent and ophicleide, a wide range and had a consistently rich, pleasing sound throughout that range. It was flexible both in tone quality and intonation and could blend well with a variety of ensembles, gaining it immediate popularity with composers and conductors as the principal tenor-voices solo instrument in brass band settings, especially in Britain. It is no surprise, then, that when British composers – some of the same ones who were writing for brass bands – began to write serious, original music for the concert band in the early 20th century, they used the euphonium in a very similar role.

When American composers also began writing for the concert band as its own artistic medium in the 1930s and 1940s, they continued the British brass and concert band tradition of using the euphonium as the principal tenor-voiced solo.
This is not to say that composers, then and now, valued the euphonium only for its lyrical capabilities. Indeed, examination of a large body of concert band literature reveals that the euphonium functions as a "jack of all trades."

Though the euphonium was, as previously noted, embraced from its earliest days by composers and arrangers in band settings, orchestral composers have, by and large, not taken advantage of this capability. There are, nevertheless, several orchestral works, a few of which are standard repertoire, in which composers have called for instruments, such as the Wagner tuba, for which euphonium is commonly substituted in the present.

In contrast to the long-standing practice of extensive euphonium use in wind bands and orchestras, there was, until approximately forty years ago, literally no body of solo literature written specifically for the euphonium, and euphonium players were forced to borrow the literature of other instruments. Fortunately, given the instrument's multifaceted capabilities discussed above, solos for many different instruments are easily adaptable to performance on the euphonium.

The earliest surviving solo composition written specifically for euphonium or one of its saxhorn cousins is the Concerto per Flicorno Basso (1872) by Amilcare Ponchielli. For almost a century after this, the euphonium solo repertoire consisted of only a dozen or so virtuosic pieces, mostly light in character. However, in the 1960s and 1970s, American composers began to write the first of the "new school" of serious, artistic solo works specifically for euphonium. Since then, there has been a virtual explosion of solo repertoire for the euphonium. In a mere four decades, the solo literature has expanded from virtually zero to thousands of pieces. More and more composers have become aware of the tremendous soloistic capabilities of the euphonium, and have constantly "pushed the envelope" with new literature in terms of tessitura, endurance, technical demands, and extended techniques.

Finally, the euphonium has, thanks to a handful of enterprising individuals, begun to make inroads in jazz, pop and other non-concert performance settings. One well-known euphonium player from the world of popular music is Don McGlashan, the New Zealand musician who began his musical career as an orchestral brass player before finding success in popular music with bands such as Blam Blam Blam and The Mutton Birds.

See also 

 List of euphonium players
 William Bell (tuba player)
 List of euphonium, baritone horn and tenor horn manufacturers
 Steven Mead
 Brian Bowman

Notes

References

Sources
 Retrieved 28 January 2008
 Retrieved 28 January 2008

External links 

 Weston, Stephen. 2015 "Bass-Euphonium." Grove Music Online. 13 Sep. 2018. (by subscription)
 Euphonium Music Guide A list of original euphonium literature.
 

B-flat instruments
Concert band instruments
German musical instruments
English musical instruments
Tubas
Marching band instruments